Mahmut Bozteke (born 21 June 1997) is a Turkish Para Taekwondo athlete. He qualified for the para-taekwondo games at the rescheduled 2020 Summer Paralympics held in Tokyo, Japan, on 24 August 2021.

Early life
At age eleven, his arms were caught in the tail shaft of a tractor while he was working in a pistachio tree garden. Bozteke's arms were severed in the accident, and he was hospitalised for three and half months. He had a partial amputation of his arms and tissue taken from his legs allowed partial reconstruction of his arms over the course of fifteen operations. He was bedridden at home for a year recovering from injury and the operations. Having no hands, he learned to do his daily work with his feet. He was introduced to Taekwondo at a gymnasium of the Youth and Sports Provincial Directorate in his neighbourhood on the recommendation of his physiotherapist, who told him, "You use your feet well, I think you can practise taekwondo." During his secondary education at Kanuni Sultan Süleyman High School, he participated in regional competitions for para-swimming in the S6 disability class.

Sports career
The 23-year-old athlete became the Turkish champion in Para Taekwondo before he competed internationally.

He won the bronze medal in the K44 disability class in the under  weight class at the 2016 European Para Taekwondo Championships held in Warsaw, Poland. At the 2017 World Para Taekwondo Championships in London, England, he won the silver medal in the K44  event. Bozteke won the gold medal in the K44  event at the 2019 Para Taekwondo Championships in Bari, Italy.

Bozteke qualified for the para-taekwondo games at the rescheduled 2020 Summer Paralympics to be held in Tokyo, Japan, beginning on 24 August 2021. He waon one of the bronze medals in the -61 kg event.

References

1997 births
Living people
Paralympic taekwondo practitioners of Turkey
Turkish male taekwondo practitioners
Taekwondo practitioners at the 2020 Summer Paralympics
Paralympic bronze medalists for Turkey
Paralympic medalists in taekwondo
Medalists at the 2020 Summer Paralympics
21st-century Turkish people